Agnes Township is a township in Grand Forks County, North Dakota, United States. It has 72 people and 83 occupied houses, all rural. It has a population density of slightly over two people per square mile.

References

Townships in Grand Forks County, North Dakota
Townships in North Dakota